Ulla Margareta Löfven (also spelt Löfvén,  née Arvidsson, previously Johansson, born 29 May 1951) is a Swedish politician and trade unionist. She is married to former Prime Minister Stefan Löfven, the former leader of the Social Democrats.

She first met Stefan Löfven when they both worked at Hägglunds & Söner in 1992; he worked as a welder and she was a representative for the local branch of a trade union. She was married and had two children when they met. They married in November 2003. 

She was employed as the assistant of Carin Jämtin, the party secretary of the Social Democrats, until her husband was elected party leader in January 2012.

References

|-

|-

|-

21st-century Swedish women politicians
1951 births
Living people
Spouses of prime ministers of Sweden
Swedish Social Democratic Party politicians